Xystophora asthenodes is a moth of the family Gelechiidae. It was described by Edward Meyrick in 1923. It is found in north-western India.

The wingspan is 13–14 mm. The forewings are pale grey closely sprinkled with pale ochreous. The stigmata are faint, cloudy, light grey, the plical rather obliquely before the first discal. Sometimes, there is a faint shadowy darker band at two-thirds. The hindwings are grey.

References

Moths described in 1923
Xystophora